Aeolidiella albopunctata is a species of sea slug, an aeolid nudibranch in the family Aeolidiidae.

Distribution 
This marine species was described from Hong Kong,  China.

References 

 Liu J.Y. [Ruiyu] (ed.). (2008). Checklist of marine biota of China seas. China Science Press. 1267 pp.

Aeolidiidae
Gastropods described in 1992